Denis Tomic (born 27 January 1998) is an Austrian professional footballer who plays as a striker for Tirol.

Career
Tomic is a product of the youth academy of Absam. He began his senior career with them in 2013, and in 2014 moved to the academy of Austria Wien. In 2016, he was promoted to Austria Wien's reserves. In 2018, he returned to Absam before moving to the reserves of Wacker Innsbruck the following year. In 2020, he transferred to Tirol, and in June 2021 was promoted to their senior team.

International career
Tomic is a youth international for Austria, having represented the Austria U17s once in 2014.

References

External links
 
 OEFB Profile

1998 births
Living people
Austrian footballers
Austria youth international footballers
WSG Tirol players
Austrian Football Bundesliga players
2. Liga (Austria) players
Austrian Regionalliga players
Association football forwards
FC Wacker Innsbruck (2002) players
FK Austria Wien players